Pavillon des sports Modibo Keita is an indoor sporting arena located in Bamako, Mali.
The stadium hosted the finals of the 2009 Mali Handball Cup on August 11, 2009. The event was attended by Amadou Toumani Touré, President of the Republic of Mali. The stadium was built in 1960 and renovated in 2011 ahead of the 2011 Women's African Basketball Championship. In 2008, it was reported that the arena has been declining due to lack of maintenance. 

The venue is named after Modibo Keïta, the first President of Mali.

References

Indoor arenas in Mali
Buildings and structures in Bamako
Basketball in Mali
Handball venues in Mali